ModSquad is a global digital engagement services company based in the United States. The company currently has over 10,000 moderators in its network. ModSquad provides managed, on-demand customer service, content moderation, social media, and community management services and teams across online, e-commerce, in-game, in-app, and social media channels.

History
The company was founded by attorney Amy Pritchard in 2007, to provide brands with a way to give the members of their online communities a more relevant, personalized experience. Looking at the step change that today's brands could make in managing their online communities as akin to the London Mods youth culture, Pritchard – along with COO Mike Pinkerton – created a services based company around remote community managers and moderators (Mods), to staff virtual sites. The firm originally specialized in providing avatar staffing, but soon expanded to supplying forum moderation and customer service across a wide range of brands. By 2010, the company had 500 experienced Mods working on more than 100 clients' sites. In 2015, ModSquad was awarded a Silver Stevie Award in the Company of the Year (Internet/New Media) category of the 13th Annual American Business Awards. Also that year, the company was recognized as Customer Service Team of the Year in the Golden Bridge Awards.

Present
Presently the company has over 10,000 "Mods," or moderators, in its network, a 24/7 operations center in Sacramento, California established in 2010, 24/7 operations centers in Austin, Texas, and Derry, Northern Ireland, and offices in Brooklyn, New York[7] and London. In November 2015, the company, formerly known as Metaverse Mod Squad, changed its name to ModSquad. Clients include Warner Bros. (including Gossip Girl and Harry Potter), HarperCollins, Cartoon Network, Nickelodeon, the National Football League, Reel FX (parent firm of Webosaurs), Electronic Arts, enVie Interactive, Kimpton Hotels, Vimeo, and the United States Department of State.

Operations
The company operates by providing services via 10,000+ multilingual Mods from 70 countries in its network via a series of outsource-provision contracts. Operating under a predefined customer service brief, vetted and oriented Mods augment or replace in-house teams by managing a variety of online community activities and specializing in digital engagement from customer service and maintenance tickets to social and forum moderation and quality assurance. Mods help to maintain and shape clients’ unique online communities by assisting with community events, aiding users with technical and social issues, orienting new arrivals, and channeling community concerns and feedback to corporate clients.
 
Mods take both an active position in forums by acting as the corporate client to provide services, as well as passively looking through the end user experience to monitor social media and quality assurance testing. In active mode, Mods moderate content, chat with customers, manage communities, protect child safety (approved by Safe Kids USA), monitor game experience, provide customer support, check for bugs, and manage social media accounts. Using a variety of Customer Relations Management systems, Mods work from anywhere in the world with secure internet access, enabling native-language services to be provided in 50+ languages and dialects during peak traffic and activity hours.

References

External links
ModSquad homepage
Safe Kids USA approval

Business services companies established in 2007
Companies based in Sacramento, California
Providers of services to on-line companies
Online companies of the United States
2007 establishments in California